Chronic Bachelor is a 2003 Indian Malayalam-language romantic comedy drama film, written and directed by Siddique. It is about the life of Sathyaprathapan, a bachelor. It features Mammootty, Mukesh, Rambha, Indraja, Bhavana, Innocent and Biju Menon. Jyothika was signed as the lead actress but later was replaced by  Rambha. The movie was produced by Fazil. The film was a commercial success. It was later remade in Tamil as Engal Anna starring Vijayakanth and in Telugu as Kushi Kushiga with Jagapati Babu.

Plot

The film opens with a flashback showing the family feud between families of Sathyaprathapan and Bhavani. Sathyaprathapan's sister and Bhavani's cousin are in love. The murder of Bhavani's cousin Vishnu, is wrongly accused on Balagangadharan, father of Sathyaprathapan. Sathyaprathapan's sister commits suicide and Sathyaprathapan turns against his father, who dies soon. He starts to help Bhavani's family and mortgages his own house to finance her factory. A love develops between Sathyaprathapan and Bhavani. But Bhavani's greedy father wants to destroy Sathyaprathapan's family and tries to take their home. That is when Parameshwara Pillai (Sathyaprathapan's uncle) shows up, Sathyaprathapan's mother requests Pillai to prove Balagangadharan's innocence. Parameshwaran Pillai and Sathyaprathapan finds Kuruvilla who witnessed the murder being committed by goons send by Bhavani's father. Meanwhile, Sathyaprathapan's mother faints and dies in the hospital. While in the hospital, his mother tells how Balagangadharan had a different wife and he should ask them forgiveness. He storms into Bhavani's house and accuses her dad, also trying to make her understand the truth but she does not believe him and stands by her father. Then Sathyaprathapan says he does not love her any more and vows that he will never trust a woman by remaining a chronic bachelor forever.

Then film comes to the present time showing a legal battle between Sathyaprathapan (now called SP) and Bhavani. Bhavani becomes furious when SP wins the legal battle to get back his house. She vows to destroy SP.

From here, the story moves to the day-to-day life of SP and falls into a comic track throughout the first half. SP is now a wealthy entrepreneur. SP has a half-sister, Sandhya, who is his step-sister. He now lives for her. But she does not know that SP is her brother, although she stays next door to him. Kuruvilla is SP's aide and he too is a bachelor. Bhama comes to stay in the hostel, near SP's house where Sandhya stays and tries to win the heart of SP. But SP considers her a nuisance.

SP agrees to take care of Sreekumar. He is the son of Parameshwaran Pillai, who had helped SP to become a successful businessman. Sreekumar is a flirt and womanizer. He is now after Sandhya and agrees to stay with SP, when he realises that Sandhya stays next door to SP. Comical scenes recur throughout the movie, where Kuruvilla, who does not like Sreekumar and his friend Ugran staying with them, tries to get them out of the house.

Bhama learns that SP is sponsoring Sandhya's studies and confronts him. SP tells her that Sandhya is his sister. Bhama then asks Sandhya to call SP for her birthday party. But SP gets upset and confronts Bhama. Bhama then reveals that her sponsor was SP all the while. During the birthday party, Bhavani comes and takes Bhama away. Then it becomes clear that Bhama is Bhavani's sister. Rivalry arises between Bhama and Bhavani and Bhama runs away from home and promises to help SP, but he tells her he has no hatred at all. Then Bhama's family members come to take her forcefully, but is stopped by Sreekumar and SP.

Then SP asks Sandhya to move to his house. Srikumar and Ugran is moved to the guest house. Sandhya finally shows affection to Sreekumar. One day SP and Kuruvilla catch Sreekumar trying to reach Sandhya through the balcony. SP knows that both of them love each other. And he tells that he knew it all the while and he arranged for everything. He fixes the marriage of Sandhya and Sreekumar. He transfers everything he has to Sandhya's name because Sreekumar's family thought Sandhya was an orphan. SP tells everything to Parameshwaran Pillai's family which is overheard by Sandhya who runs home crying. SP upset runs to comfort her, where he explains how he will live his life as an apology to her mother's curses. But Sandhya tells that her mother loved him and told her to ask forgiveness if she sees him. Now Sandhya and SP re-unite as siblings. During the marriage festivities, Bhavani and her brother Hareendhran come to prevent the celebrations. Along with them comes the elder brother of Sandhya, Shekarankutty. He challenges SP, saying that he has more right over Sandhya as he is her brother, while SP is just a half-brother. Shekarankutty then claims all of SP's property, which SP is willing to give, provided Sandhya lives happily and marries Sreekumar. Bhavani's family use Shekarankutty to take advantage of SP; first by trying to snatch his company then trying to snatch his home. In the brawl, SP vows that Sandhya will marry Sreekumar and he will wipe off everyone who stands in the way. Bhavani then tells SP that Sandhya will be married off to Hareendhran. Shekarankutty supports in the name of revenge.

Sandhya, torn between two brothers, comes running when the brothers fight among themselves on the account of who Sandhya will marry. She says she would marry anyone that her brothers tell her too because she cares about both of them. SP then says he know what needs to be done to end the family feud, which should have been long ago. He then marches to Bhavani's house and starts hitting Bhavani's father thinking of killing him. In the end, SP points at Kuruvilla and says he is the witness of Vishnu's murder. Bhavani's father finally admits that he killed Vishnu and framed it on SP's father. Then SP pours kerosene on Bhavani's dad and as he approach Bhavani, he is stopped by Hareendaran who begs for his sisters life. Bhavani realizes her mistakes and goes to SP's house to apologize. But she tells SP that only thing she can now offer is the marriage proposal of her sister Bhama to SP. SP initially refuses when Sreekumar tells that he'll also remain a bachelor if SP does not marry. SP finally agrees and tells him to go inside with Bhama.

Cast

Mammootty as Sathyaprathapan a.k.a. SP
Mukesh as Sreekumar
Rambha as Bhama
Indraja as Bhavani
Bhavana as Sandhya
Innocent as Kuruvilla
Harisree Ashokan as Ugran (cousin of Sreekumar)
Janardhanan as Parameshwaran Pillai
 Mohan Ayeroor
Biju Menon as Hareendran
Lalu Alex as Balagangadharan and Shekarankutty (double role)
K. P. A. C. Lalitha as Vimala
Mohan Ayroor as Kunnampurathu Neelakandan
Idavela Babu as Kuruvilla (young)
Sabitha Anand as Saraswathi (SP's mother)
Seema G. Nair as Kunjulakshmi
Zeenath as Bhavani, Hareendran, and Bhama's mother
Biyon as Young Sathyaprathapan
Nivia Rebin as Young Bhavani
Joemon Joshy as SP's Neighbour
Shajin as Vishnu
Deepika Mohan as Sreekumar's relative
Nazeer Latheef as Sreekumar's relative
Binda as Bhama's friend
Beena Sabu as Matron

Music

Reception
The film received positive reviews and became commercial success at the box office. The film was the highest grossing Malayalam film in the year 2003. Sify wrote, "Mammootty has given a very restrained performance as SP and he has allowed other characters like Innocent, Mukesh and Rambha to steal the punchlines and songs. Siddique should be appreciated for weaving a run-of-the-mill story of revenge, ego and misunderstandings mixed well into a comedy drama."

References

External links

2003 films
2000s Malayalam-language films
2003 romantic comedy-drama films
Indian romantic comedy-drama films
Films directed by Siddique
Malayalam films remade in other languages
2003 comedy films
2003 drama films